Brigadier John Wright  (10 October 1940 – 4 May 2016) was a British Army officer and polo administrator.

Wright was born in Peshawar, British India (now Pakistan), the son of Thomas Wright, a colonel in the British Army, serving in India.

References

1940 births
2016 deaths
Royal Tank Regiment officers
16th/5th The Queen's Royal Lancers officers
Commanders of the Order of the British Empire
British Army brigadiers